Unconditional: Love Songs is the third compilation album released by Australian singer-songwriter Peter Andre, following The Very Best of Peter Andre: The Hits Collection (2002) and The Platinum Collection (2005).

Background
Following the success of 'Revelation', it was announced that Conehead Management had bought the rights to release all of Andre's previous material in a new compilation format. On 2 December 2009, it was announced that Conehead had decided to release a 'Love Songs' compilation, featuring ten of Andre's classic love songs, as well as five new recordings specifically for the album. On 29 January 2010, the album's one and only single, I Can't Make You Love Me, was released via Digital Download. The album was officially released on 1 February 2010, selling over 65,000 copies and being certified silver, as well as peaking at #7 on the UK Albums Chart. To promote the album, Andre embarked on a nationwide promotional tour, signing copies of the album and undertaking various print, television and radio interviews. Andre performed the album's new recordings as part of his Revelation Tour, which started in November 2010.

Track listing

Charts

Weekly charts

Year-end charts

Certifications

References

Peter Andre albums
2010 compilation albums